Um Úrnat frá Björk (in English, About Úrnat from Björk) is an Icelandic fairy tale and poetry book by Björk.

It was released by Smekkleysa, a publishing company created by Björk's friends, in 1984, but there are some doubts about its accurate year of publication.

The book has only 16 pages hand-written and illustrated by Björk using crayons and water-colours. There are only 100 copies, so they are special collectors' editions. Their price varies between US$100 and US$700 (€75-€525).

External links
  Um Úrnat frá Björk in English
 The book

Books by Björk
Icelandic books
Poetry collections